L'Chaim Kosher Vodka is a line of Israeli kosher alcoholic beverages. It is distributed by Group Force Capital, LLC of Miami, Florida, in the Wynwood Art District. L'Chaim (meaning “to life” in Hebrew) is certified kosher by the Orthodox Union, the largest certifying body in the world. It is one of a number of certified kosher spirits.

History
In 2010, L'Chaim Kosher Vodka was introduced to the market in New York, New Jersey, and Florida. In 2011, L'Chaim signed a national distribution contract with Southern Wine & Spirits, the nation's largest wine and spirits distributor.

Ingredients and creation
L'Chaim Kosher Vodka is a corn-based vodka made with water from springs in the Golan Heights, and undergoes a triple distillation process in Or Akiva, along Israel's coastal plain. It is prepared according to a Russian and European recipe brought to Israel by Jewish immigrants. The vodka has been described as having "a crisp, slightly spicy flavor with hints of vanilla."

The kosher certification of the vodka is intended to appeal to Jews and non-Jews alike.

L'Chaim Vodka Kosher for Passover Line
In 2012, L'Chaim launched a kosher for Passover vodka made from beets instead of corn. The vodka is suitable to be consumed on the Jewish holiday of Passover, only when it is in special packaging. The Kosher for Passover edition has a gold design on the bottle, as opposed to silver.

Products

See also

References

External links

Israeli alcoholic drinks
Israeli vodkas
Israeli brands
Kosher drinks